Blue Planet Man is a 1993 album by organist Big John Patton which features John Zorn and was originally released on King Records/Paddle Wheel Records in Japan in 1993 and subsequently released in the USA on Evidence Records in 1997. The album was considered part of Patton's 1990s "comeback".

Reception
The Allmusic review by Alex Henderson awarded the album 3 stars noting that "Not one of Patton's essential releases, Blue Planet Man is definitely enjoyable and well-intended -- the album reminds us that Patton can hardly be considered one-dimensional".

Track listing 
All compositions by "Big" John Patton except as indicated.
 "Congo Chant" - 8:47
 "Funky Mama" - 6:49
 "Claudette" - 7:56
 "Chip" - 5:43
 "Popeye" - 8:01
 "What's Your Name" - 4:25
 "U-Jama" (Shepp) - 6:53
 "Bama" - 4:28
Recorded at Skyline Studios, New York, April 12 & 13, 1993

Personnel 

 Big John Patton – organ
 John Zorn – alto saxophone
 Pete Chavez – tenor saxophone
 Bill Saxton – tenor and soprano saxophones
 Ed Cherry – guitar
 Eddie Gladden – drums
 Lawrence Killian – congas
 Rorie Nichols – vocal

References

1993 albums
Evidence Music albums
John Patton (musician) albums